Mimoschinia is a genus of moths of the family Crambidae. It contains only one species, Mimoschinia rufofascialis, the rufous-banded pyralid moth or barberpole caterpillar, which is found in the Caribbean, from Alberta to British Columbia, south to Texas and California and in Mexico.

The wingspan is 14–18 mm. The forewings are greenish or greyish buff with reddish-brown antemedial and postmedial bands, as well as a reddish-brown triangular patch on the middle of the costa and a small apical patch. The hindwings are greyish-buff, but somewhat lighter at the median area. Adults have been recorded on wing from January to October, with most records from June to September.

The larvae feed on various Malvaceae species, including Malvastrum, Abutilon, Wissadula, Sida, Alcea and Malvella species. They feed on the seeds of their host plant. The larvae have a white and wine-red body and a light yellow head.

Subspecies
Mimoschinia rufofascialis rufofascialis (Caribbean)
Mimoschinia rufofascialis decorata (Druce, 1898) (Arizona, Mexico)
Mimoschinia rufofascialis novalis (Grote, 1876) (from Alberta to British Columbia, south to Texas and California)
Mimoschinia rufofascialis nuchalis (Grote, 1878) (California)

References

Natural History Museum Lepidoptera genus database

Eurrhypini
Crambidae genera
Taxa named by William Warren (entomologist)